The Metropolitan Railway C class was a group of four 0-4-4T steam tank locomotives built in 1891 by Neilson and Company. They were to a design by James Stirling, originally the  Q class of the South Eastern Railway, and were fitted with condensing apparatus for working in tunnels.

The Neilson works numbers were 4352–5, they were delivered in June 1891 as Metropolitan Railway nos. 67–70. No. 67 was sold in 1917 to the Ministry of Munitions; the others were sold in 1923 to Charles Williams of Morriston.

References 

C
0-4-4T locomotives
Neilson locomotives
Railway locomotives introduced in 1891
Condensing steam locomotives
Standard gauge steam locomotives of Great Britain